Fructidor is the twelfth month in the French Republican Calendar. The month was named after the Latin word fructus, which means "fruit".

Fructidor is the third month of the summer quarter (mois d'été). By the Gregorian calendar, Fructidor starts on either August 18 or August 19 and ends exactly thirty days later, on September 16 or September 17. Fructidor follows the month of Thermidor and precedes the Sansculottides. 

The month is often used as a shorthand term for the Coup of 18 Fructidor.

Day name table 

Like all French Republican months, Fructidor lasted thirty days and was divided into three weeks called decades (décades) which each lasted ten days. Within every decade, each day had the name of an agricultural plant, except the fifth - the Quintidi - which had the name of an animal, and the tenth - the Decadi - which had the name of an agricultural tool.

Conversion table

External links 
 Summer Quarter of Year II (facsimile)

French Republican calendar
August
September

sv:Franska revolutionskalendern#Månaderna